Sir John Howarth Grey (19 July 1875 – 1 January 1960), was a British Cotton Manufacturer and Liberal Party politician.

Background
Grey was born the son of James Mitchell Grey. In 1901 he married Emma Harling. They had one son and one daughter. He was knighted in 1935.

Professional career
Grey was Chairman, John Grey Ltd, Burnley, Cotton Manufacturers,  Director of Lancashire Cotton Corporation, Ltd and the Manchester Board of North British Mercantile Ins. Co. Ltd. He was President of the Cotton Spinners and Manufacturers Association. He was Chairman of the Burnley Building Society.

Political career
Grey was elected to Burnley Town Council in 1910, appointed an Alderman in 1923 and retired in 1949. He was appointed a Justice of the Peace for Burnley in 1913. He was Liberal candidate for the Burnley division of Lancashire at the 1918 General Election. He did not stand for parliament again.

Electoral record

References

1875 births
1960 deaths
Liberal Party (UK) parliamentary candidates